The 2008 FIFA Beach Soccer World Cup qualifiers for (UEFA) was the first FIFA Beach Soccer World Cup qualification championship for Europe, held in Benidorm, Spain. Held in May 2008, hosts Spain won the championship, with Portugal finishing second and Russia winning the third place play off to finish third, beating Italy who finished fourth. The four nations moved on to play in the 2008 FIFA Beach Soccer World Cup in Marseille, France, from July 17 to 27. France qualified as the fifth European nation, being the hosts of the world cup.

Participating teams
24 teams confirmed their participation in the competition.

Group stage
The 24 teams were drawn into 6 groups of 4 teams.

Group A

Group B

Group C

Group D

Group E

Group F

Knockout stage

Round of 16

Quarter finals

Semi finals

Third place play off

Final

Winners

References

Results, at the Roonba
Beach Soccer Worldwide reports: Day 1, Day 2, Day 3, Day 4, Day 5, Day 6, Day 7.

Beach Soccer World Cup Qualification (Uefa) 2008
Qualification (Uefa)
2008
FIFA Beach Soccer World Cup qualification (UEFA)
2008 in beach soccer